Savela may refer to.

Efraim Savela, alternate spelling of Efraim Sevela, a Soviet-Russian-Israeli screenwriter, director, producer, and writer.
Mika Savela, Finnish trance musician
Savela, Helsinki, district of Helsinki
Savela, Jyväskylä, district of  Jyväskylä

See also
Savala, village in Maidla Parish, Ida-Viru County, Estonia